Pyura stolonifera, commonly known in South Africa as "red bait" (or "rooiaas" in Afrikaans), is a sessile ascidian, or sea squirt, that lives in coastal waters attached to rocks or artificial structures. Sea squirts are named for their habit of squirting a stream of water from their exhalant siphons when touched at low tide.

Description
Pyura stolonifera is a very large solitary ascidian. It can grow to well over 15 cm in height. It has a thick pale exterior or 'tunic' which has a wrinkled brown covering. It has large inhalant and exhalant siphons with slightly scalloped edges, usually set close together. It is usually thickly covered with encrusting organisms.

Distribution
This species is found in coastal areas of the cool-temperate and warm-temperate marine bioregions of southern African, from Namibia on the west coast to south-eastern South Africa, but is absent from the region's subtropical and tropical bioregions. It is found from the intertidal zone to at least 10 m underwater.

Taxonomy
Despite being one of the world's most conspicuous sea squirts, Pyura stolonifera is often confused with other, morphologically similar ascidians. It is the namesake of the so-called "P. stolonifera species complex" because the name P. stolonifera is often indiscriminately applied to all of them. The species complex presently includes the following species:

Pyura herdmani (Herdman's red bait), an African species whose range spans the temperate, subtropical and tropical marine bioregions of southern Africa, and that has also been reported from north-western Africa. Genetic data indicate that this species comprises at least three distinct evolutionary lineages, each of which may represent a distinct species: a temperate southern African form that often shares its habitat with P. stolonifera, a subtropical/tropical southern African form, and a north-western African form.

Pyura praeputialis, commonly known as "cunjevoi" or "cunjie", is common in coastal areas of the Australian mainland and ranges from southern Queensland to Cape Otway in Victoria. It is a non-indigenous species in Antofagasta, Chile.

Pyura doppelgangera (doppelganger cunjevoi) is morphologically very similar to P. praeputialis, but is usually smaller. It is particularly common in Tasmania but has also been reported from mainland Australia (Victoria and South Australia) and New Zealand.

Pyura dalbyi (yellow cunjevoi) is common in Victoria. A small, geographically isolated population has been reported from Albany, Western Australia.

References

Stolidobranchia
Animals described in 1878